Anne K. McKeig (born February 9, 1967) is an associate justice of the Minnesota Supreme Court. She is its first Native American justice. She was previously a judge of the Minnesota Fourth District Court in Hennepin County from 2008 to 2016.

Early life and education
McKeig was raised in Federal Dam, Minnesota and attended Northland High School in Remer, Minnesota. She is a descendant of the White Earth Band of Ojibwe.

McKeig received a Bachelor of Arts from St. Catherine University in 1989 and a J.D. degree from Hamline University School of Law in 1992.

Career
McKeig was an assistant attorney for Hennepin County of the child protection division, specializing in Native American child welfare cases, for more than 15 years.

McKeig was a family court judge of the Minnesota Fourth District Court in Hennepin County, appointed by Republican Governor Tim Pawlenty in 2008. She was the presiding judge of the family court since 2013.

DFL Governor Mark Dayton announced his appointment of McKeig to the Minnesota Supreme Court on June 28, 2016. She is its first Native American justice as well as the first female Native American to serve on any state supreme court. Her appointment also marked the second time the court had a majority of women since 1991. She joined the court on August 31, 2016. Her formal investiture ceremony was held on September 15, 2016.

McKeig is also an adjunct professor at Mitchell Hamline School of Law.

See also
List of Native American jurists

References

External links
 Minnesota Judicial Branch directory web page

1967 births
Living people
Justices of the Minnesota Supreme Court
Native American judges
St. Catherine University alumni
Hamline University School of Law alumni
Minnesota state court judges
21st-century American judges
21st-century American women judges
20th-century Native American women
20th-century Native Americans
21st-century Native American women
21st-century Native Americans
Native American people in Minnesota